Nikolaos Antoniadis (born 3 January 1971) is a Greek sport shooter. He placed thirty-first in trap shooting at the 2004 Summer Olympics, representing the host nation Greece. Antoniadis also serves as a member of the Shooting Federation of Greece, where he trains full-time under head coach Timur Matoian.

Filling out one of Olympic places reserved to the host nation, Antoniadis was named as part of the Greek shooting team in the men's trap at the 2004 Summer Olympics in Athens. Less experienced to the sport, Antoniadis fired 110 out of 125 targets to end up in thirty-first from a field of thirty-five shooters, failing to advance to the final.

References

External links

Olympic Profile – In.gr

1971 births
Living people
Greek male sport shooters
Olympic shooters of Greece
Shooters at the 2004 Summer Olympics
Sportspeople from Xanthi